EvoPro Racing is an Irish UCI Continental cycling team focusing on road bicycle racing. The Irish team is run by ex-professional Morgan Fox.

Team roster

Major wins
2019
 Gravel and Tar, Luke Mudgway
  Overall New Zealand Cycle Classic, Aaron Gate
Stage 1, Aaron Gate
Stage 1 Belgrade Banjaluka, Aaron Gate
Stages 2 & 3 Belgrade Banjaluka, Wouter Wippert
Stage 3 Rhône-Alpes Isère Tour, Harry Sweeny
Stage 5 Tour de Hongrie, Wouter Wippert

References

External links

Cycling teams based in Ireland
Cycling teams established in 2019
2019 establishments in Ireland